Georges Brulé (23 October 1876 – 31 October 1961) was a French modern pentathlete. He competed at the 1912 and 1920 Summer Olympics.

References

External links
 

1876 births
1961 deaths
French male modern pentathletes
Olympic modern pentathletes of France
Modern pentathletes at the 1912 Summer Olympics
Modern pentathletes at the 1920 Summer Olympics
Sportspeople from Dreux